Mike Boehm (October 23, 1955 - May 2, 2019) was an American music critic and arts reporter. He wrote for the Los Angeles Times from 1988 to 2015.

References

1955 births
2019 deaths
Yale University alumni
Columbia University Graduate School of Journalism alumni
American music critics
Los Angeles Times people